Mridula Mukherjee (née Mahajan) is an Indian historian known for her work on the role of peasants in the Indian independence movement. She is an ex-chairperson of the Centre for Historical Studies at the Jawaharlal Nehru University, Delhi, and former director of the Nehru Memorial Museum and Library.

Early life and education
Mukherjee was born in 1950 in New Delhi, India. Her parents, Vidya Dhar Mahajan and Savitri Shori Mahajan, had been renowned teachers of history in Lahore, from where they emigrated to New Delhi following the Partition of India in 1947. Her sister, Sucheta Mahajan, is a professor of Indian history at JNU, and her brother is Ajay Mahajan. Mukherjee is married to the historian Aditya Mukherjee. They have a daughter, Madhavi.

Mukherjee graduated from Lady Shri Ram College in New Delhi. She joined Jawaharlal Nehru University (JNU) as a post-graduate student in 1971, from where she obtained a PhD degree. Her doctoral thesis advisor was Bipan Chandra.

Career
In 1972, while working on her doctoral thesis, Mukherjee was hired by the Centre for Historical Studies, JNU, as a faculty member, from where she retired as a professor of history. She was a chairperson of the Centre as well. In 2005, she was appointed  the director of the Nehru Memorial Museum and Library, New Delhi.

Research
She investigated agrarian history in the Punjab. She argued that despite extensive irrigation works, colonialisation caused agricultural involution, with the number of workers per unit area rising and production dropping. She also analysed peasant movements in the erstwhile princely states of the Punjab across the pre- and post-1947 periods. Her critical analysis of a Marxian orientation of peasant consciousness has been highlighted.

A common thread running through Mukherjee's work has been a criticism of the Subaltern mode of historical inquiry, which informs her analysis of peasant movements as well as her other major contribution: modern Indian history. This is encapsulated by the two books co-written with Bipan Chandra et al: India's Struggle for Independence and India after independence: 1947-2000. In the former book, the authors sought to "demolish the influence of the Cambridge and Subaltern 'schools' reflected in the writing on colonialism and nationalism in India".

Ideology
After Mukherjee was appointed the director of the Nehru Memorial Museum and Library (NMML) two letters, written between February 2008 and June 2009 and signed by various academics, including Ramchandra Guha and Sumit Sarkar were sent to the NMML's executive council complaining of alleged deterioration in scholarly standards of the centre.

Supporting Mukherjee, another set of academics, including Irfan Habib and Madhu Kishwar, wrote to the Prime Minister of India protesting her treatment. Mukherjee herself pointed out that under her tenure, the NMML had completed a ten-volume publication of the selected works of Jayaprakash Narayan, besides initiating a digitisation project.

The executive council disregarded the petition and extended Mukherjee's tenure for another two years.

Following the end of her appointment, a search for her replacement ended up in a court case with accusations of irregularities. The Delhi High Court struck down the appointment of Mukherjee's successor on the grounds that the process was faulty and against norms.

Selected publications

Books

Articles

References

External links
 

Living people
People from Lahore
Historians of South Asia
1950 births
Indian Marxist historians
20th-century Indian women scientists
20th-century Indian scientists
21st-century Indian women scientists
21st-century Indian scientists
20th-century Indian women writers
20th-century Indian writers
21st-century Indian women writers
21st-century Indian writers
Indian political writers
Indian women political writers
Educators from Delhi
Women educators from Delhi
Writers from Delhi
Indian women historians
21st-century Indian historians
Women writers from Delhi